Nikki Anne Boyd (born 20 May 1983) is an Australian politician. She has been the Australian Labor Party member for Pine Rivers in the Queensland Legislative Assembly since 2015.

Early life 
Prior to entering politics, Boyd was a lead organiser for the United Voice trade union, and an early childhood educator.

Political career
She was first elected the member for the seat of Pine Rivers at 2015 election with a 21.3% swing. She was re-elected with swings to her in 2017 election and 2020 election.

Boyd served as the Deputy Government Whip in the Legislative Assembly of Queensland from 2017 to 2020.

In May 2020 Boyd was appointed as the Assistant Minister to the Deputy Premier and Health. Following the 2020 Queensland state election, she was appointed as the Assistant Minister for Local Government in the Third Palaszczuk Ministry.

See also
Second Palaszczuk Ministry
Third Palaszczuk Ministry

References

1983 births
Living people
Members of the Queensland Legislative Assembly
Australian Labor Party members of the Parliament of Queensland
Australian trade unionists
Australian schoolteachers
21st-century Australian politicians
Women members of the Queensland Legislative Assembly
21st-century Australian women politicians